Great Synagogue or Grand Synagogue may refer to;

 Belz Great Synagogue, in Jerusalem, the second-largest synagogue in the world
 Dohány Street Synagogue the Great Synagogue (Nagy Zsinagóga) of Budapest, Europe's largest and the world's fourth largest synagogue.
 Great City Synagogue (Lviv), Ukraine
 Great Synagogue of Europe, built Brussels in 1878, dedicated as the Synagogue of Europe in 2008
 Great Synagogue (Białystok), destroyed in 1941
 Great Synagogue (Bila Tserkva)
 Great Synagogue (Constanța)
 Great Synagogue (Copenhagen)
 Great Synagogue (Danzig), destroyed in 1939
 Great Synagogue (Deventer)
 Great Synagogue (Florence)
 Great Synagogue (Gibraltar), oldest synagogue on the Iberian Peninsula
 Great Synagogue (Grodno)
 Great Synagogue (Iaşi)
 Great Synagogue (Jasło), destroyed during World War lI
 Great Synagogue (Jerusalem)
 Great Synagogue (Katowice), destroyed in 1939
 Great Choral Synagogue (Kyiv)
 Great Synagogue (Łódź), destroyed in 1939
 Great Synagogue (Łomża), destroyed during World War II
 Great Synagogue of London, destroyed by aerial bombing in the London Blitz in 1941
 Great Synagogue (Oran), converted into a mosque in 1975
 Great Synagogue (Oświęcim), destroyed in 1939
 Great Synagogue (Petah Tikva)
 Great Synagogue (Plzeň), the world's fourth largest synagogue
 Great Synagogue (Piotrków Trybunalski)
 Great Synagogue (Rome), the largest synagogue in Rome
 Great Synagogue of Stockholm
 Great Synagogue (Sydney), opened in 1878
 Great Synagogue (Tbilisi)
 Great Synagogue (Tel Aviv), opened in 1926
 Great Synagogue (Vilna), destroyed during and after World War II
 Great Synagogue (Warsaw), destroyed in 1943 after the Warsaw Ghetto Uprising

Museums 
 The historical Great Synagogue in Amsterdam, now part of the Joods Historisch Museum (Jewish History Museum)
 Włodawa Great Synagogue, built between 1769 and 1774, now a museum complex in Poland

Synagogues in antiquity 
 Great Assembly, or Anshei Knesset HaGedolah, sometimes referred to as the Great Synagogue, of Temple times.
 Great Synagogue of Baghdad, an ancient building in present-day Iraq
 Sardis Synagogue, Manisa, Turkey - The complex destroyed in AD 616 by the Sassanian-Persians.

See also 
 New Synagogue (disambiguation)
 Old Synagogue (disambiguation)